Christian Reniery Santamaría (born 20 December 1972) is a retired Honduran football player who made his name with Olimpia and the national team in the second half of the 1990s.

Club career
Santamaría started his career at Olimpia and remained there for 10 years, except for a season at Millonarios in Colombia with whom he played in the 1997 Copa Libertadores and at Mexican side Atlético Celaya. In 2002, he moved abroad again to join Costa Rican outfit Cartaginés and he was signed by Salvadorans Municipal Limeño for the 2005 Clausura only to return to Honduras to play a season at Platense. In 2006, he had another spell in El Salvador when he was named one of three new players for Águila.

International career
Santamaría made his debut for Honduras in a December 1994 friendly match against the USA and has earned a total of 46 caps, scoring 4 goals. He has represented his country in 13 FIFA World Cup qualification matches and played at the 1995 and 1999 UNCAF Nations Cups as well as at the 1996 and 1998 CONCACAF Gold Cups.

His final international was a June 2003  friendly match against El Salvador.

International goals
Scores and results list Honduras' goal tally first.

Personal life and political career
Santamaría is a son of Raúl Graugnard and Mary Santamaría. He took his mother's name since his father left them to study in his native Brazil. Santamaría is married and has a daughter, Christian Naville.

After he retired from playing, he became a football commentator and started an acting career.
In December 2012, Santamaría officially became the first candidate to be MP of the Liberal Party for Atlántida Department.

Honours and awards

Club
C.D. Olimpia
Liga Profesional de Honduras (4): 1992–93, 1995–96, 1996–97, 1998–99
Honduran Cup: (2): 1995, 1998

Country
Honduras
 Copa Centroamericana (1): 1995

References

External links
 
 
 
  

1972 births
Living people
People from La Ceiba
Association football midfielders
Honduran footballers
Honduras international footballers
1996 CONCACAF Gold Cup players
1998 CONCACAF Gold Cup players
C.D. Olimpia players
Millonarios F.C. players
Atlético Celaya footballers
C.S. Cartaginés players
Platense F.C. players
C.D. Águila footballers
Honduran expatriate footballers
Honduran expatriate sportspeople in Mexico
Expatriate footballers in Colombia
Expatriate footballers in Mexico
Expatriate footballers in Costa Rica
Expatriate footballers in El Salvador
Liga Nacional de Fútbol Profesional de Honduras players
Liga MX players
Categoría Primera A players
Copa Centroamericana-winning players